Baramba State was one of the princely states of India during the period of the British Raj. It had its capital in Baramba town. The last ruler acceded to the Indian Union on 1 January 1948. Baramba state was made part of Cuttack district of Odisha in 1948.

History
According to family and court records, Baramba State was founded in 1305 when the land comprising two villages, Sonkha and Mohuri, were granted by the then Eastern Ganga emperor Narasimha Deva II, to a wrestler Hatakeshwar Raut in recognition for his valour. The last ruler of Baramba Princely State signed the accession to the Indian Union on 1 January 1948.

See also 
Eastern States Agency
Political integration of India

References

Princely states of Odisha
History of Odisha
Cuttack district
14th-century establishments in India
1305 establishments in Asia
1948 disestablishments in India